Martin Schalkers (born 5 April 1962) is a Dutch former racing cyclist. He rode the 1990 Tour de France as well as four editions of the Giro d'Italia.

Major results
1987
 4th Grand Prix de Fourmies
 7th Grote Prijs Jef Scherens
1988
 5th Dwars door België
 6th Grand Prix Impanis-Van Petegem
1989
 1st Grand Prix de la Libération (TTT)
 5th Kuurne–Brussels–Kuurne
1991
 2nd Grand Prix de Denain
 5th Veenendaal–Veenendaal

References

External links
 

1962 births
Living people
Dutch male cyclists
Sportspeople from Katwijk
Cyclists from South Holland